Derrick Lee Clark (born May 4, 1971 in Apopka, Florida) is a former professional American football running back who played for the Denver Broncos, Rhein Fire and Orlando Rage.Clark is the owner and head coach of the Daytona Beach Broncos.

Professional career

1994
Clark was signed by the Denver Broncos of the National Football League as an undrafted free agent on May 4, 1994. He played in all 16 regular season games, starting four at fullback. Clark rushed for 168 yards on 56 carries and scored three touchdowns. He also had nine receptions for 47 yards.

1996
The Denver Broncos re-signed Clark in February 1996 and allocated him to the World League of American Football, where he played for the Rhein Fire. He was the teams' leading rusher with 84 runs for 399 yards and three touchdowns. He also had 37 receptions for 229 yards. Following the WLAF season Clark returned to Denver, but was released during the preseason on August 18.

References

1971 births
Living people
People from Apopka, Florida
American football running backs
Florida State Seminoles football players
Denver Broncos players
Rhein Fire players
Orlando Rage players